Voldemārs Lūsis (born 7 December 1974 in Riga) is a former Latvian athlete, who competed in the javelin throw. He is the son of Jānis Lūsis (1939-2020) and Elvīra Ozoliņa. Lūsis finished in eleventh place in 2001 World Championships. He competed at the 2000 and 2004 Summer Olympics without reaching the final. During his career he was coached by Valentīna Eiduka.

Achievements

Seasonal bests by year
1998 - 79.60
1999 - 81.48
2000 - 83.08
2001 - 81.86
2002 - 81.58
2003 - 84.19
2004 - 82.76
2005 - 80.53
2006 - 83.68
2007 - 80.58

External links

1974 births
Living people
Athletes from Riga
Latvian male javelin throwers
Olympic athletes of Latvia
Athletes (track and field) at the 2000 Summer Olympics
Athletes (track and field) at the 2004 Summer Olympics